Raymond Brucker, full name Raymond Philippe Auguste Brucker (5 May 1800, Paris – 28 February 1875, Paris), was a 19th-century French writer.

A fan-worker then an essayist and homme de lettres, he converted to Catholicism in 1839. He was professor of philosophy. He wrote under various pseudonyms (Paul Séverin, Aloysius Block, Champercier, Duvernay, Ch. Dupuy, Olibrius), and in collaboration with Michel Masson (1800–1883) and with Léon Gozlan under the pseudonym Michel Raymond.

Works 
 under the pseudonym Raymond Brucker 

1833: Les cent-et-une nouvelles nouvelles des Cent-et-un, ornées de cent-et-une vignettes, recueil de nouvelles en 2 volumes, Paris, Ladvocat
1833: Le livre des conteurs, with other authors, Paris, Allardin
1837:  Mensonge, roman 2 vol., Paris, Werdet
1840: Branches d'olivier. Recueil de poésies chrétiennes, with other authors, Paris, Olivier Fulgence
1844: Les Docteurs du jour devant la famille, Paris, Sagnier et Bray
1848: Profession de foi d'un citoyen de Paris pour sa candidature à l'Assemblée nationale, Paris, Guiraudet et Jouaust
1848: Testament d'Alibaud. Contrat d'alliance entre les socialistes et les républicains, Paris, Schneider
1853: Le Carême du roi, comedy in three acts, Paris, De Soye et Bouchet
1854: Quarante-huit heures de la vie de ma mère, Paris, De Soye et Bouchet

 under the pseudonym Michel Raymond 

 1829: Le Maçon, moeurs populaires, roman in 4 vol., with Michel Masson, Paris, Ambroise Dupont et Cie, (4 vol. in-12)
This book was received with great praise of the critics. It was written in cooperation with Michel Masson. The pseudonym used was the conjunction of the first names of the men.
1832: Le Puritain de Seine-et-Marne, Paris, H. Dupuy, (375 p., front.; in-8°) 
1832–33:  Daniel le lapidaire, ou les Contes de l'atelier, Bruxelles, J.-P. Méline, This book is all written by Michel Masson. 
Michel Masson used this very pseudonym once more for the first two volumes of his book: Contes de l'atelier ou Daniel le Lapidaire. (1832–1833 (4 vol. in-8).  After the success of these two parts, he used his own name for vol 3 & 4.
1833: Les Sept péchés capitaux, novel (2 vol.) Paris, Werdet
Brucker also worked with Léon Gozlan, on a novel entitled Les Intimes. It was published in 1834 under the same pseudonym "Michel Raymond", in an attempt to ride on the success of this name. Although he never protested, after this, Michel Masson stopped all cooperation with Raymond Brucker. 
1834: Les Intimes, novel (3 vol.), with Léon Gozlan, Paris, Eugène Renduel, 
1834: third edition:
1835: Un secret, novel (2 vol.), Paris, Allardin
1838: Le Boudoir et la mansarde, novel (2 vol.), with Carle Ledhuy, Paris, C. Lachapelle
1839: Le Portefeuille de maroquin noir, novel (2 vol.), with Léon Gozlan, Paris, J. Laisné
 edition 1861: signed with Léon Gozlan, edition: Paris, Dentu, (collection Hetzel), (Pt. in-8°, 316 pages)
1839: Loi de liberté. Epitre à Raspail, Paris, Librairie Sociale
1840: Henriette, novel (2 vol. in-8), Paris, Werdet et Cie, 
1841: Scandale, (2 vol.), Paris, Paris, Werdet
1841: Maria, roman inédit, (2 vol.), Paris, C. Le Clère
1842: Les Causeries de Bruyères-le-Châtel, Paris, Werdet
1842: Un Jacobin sous la Régence, Paris, Werdet
 under the pseudonym Paul Séverin 
1838: Le Bouquet de mariage, révélations sur les mœurs du siècle, (2 vol.), Paris, Gosselin et Coquebert

References

External links 
 Raymond Bruker on data.bnf.fr
 Notice biographique sur le site de l'association d'études fouriéristes
 L'humanitaire, nouvelle
 Florian Balduc (éd.),Fantaisies Hoffmaniennes, Editions Otrante, 2016

19th-century French writers
French Roman Catholic writers
Writers from Paris
1800 births
1875 deaths